Lueger is a surname. Notable people with the surname include:

Erazem Lueger (died 1484), Slovenian knight of Predjama Castle
Karl Lueger (1844–1910), Austrian politician
Otto Lueger (1843–1911), German civil engineer, teacher, and author

See also
Luger (disambiguation)